Peder Lunde Jr. (born 9 February 1942) is a retired Norwegian sailor who competed in the 1960, 1968, 1972 and 1976 Olympics. In 1960 he won a gold medal in the Flying Dutchman class, together with Bjørn Bergvall. Eight years later he earned a silver medal in the Star class, together with Per Olav Wiken. He placed sixth in the same event in 1972, and 16th in 1976 in the three-person keelboat. In 1981-82, he was a crewmember on the yacht Berge Viking in the Whitbread Round the World Yacht Race. 

Lunde comes from a sailing family: his parents Peder and Vibeke Lunde together with uncle Børre Falkum-Hansen won a silver medal at the 1952 Summer Olympics, and his grandfather Eugen Lunde became an Olympic champion in 1924. His wife Aud is an Olympic alpine skier, and their daughter Jeanette competed at Olympics both in alpine skiing and sailing.

He resides at Snarøya.

References

External links

 

1942 births
Living people
Sportspeople from Oslo
Norwegian male sailors (sport)
Olympic sailors of Norway
Sailors at the 1960 Summer Olympics – Flying Dutchman
Sailors at the 1968 Summer Olympics – Star
Sailors at the 1972 Summer Olympics – Tempest
Sailors at the 1976 Summer Olympics – Soling
Olympic gold medalists for Norway
Olympic silver medalists for Norway
Olympic medalists in sailing
Volvo Ocean Race sailors
Royal Norwegian Yacht Club sailors
Medalists at the 1968 Summer Olympics
Medalists at the 1960 Summer Olympics